Old Spice is an American brand of male grooming products encompassing aftershaves, deodorants and antiperspirants, shampoos, body washes, and soaps. It is manufactured by Procter & Gamble.

Old Spice was launched as Early American Old Spice by William Lightfoot Schultz's soap and toiletries company, Shulton Inc., in 1937. It was first targeted to women, with the men's product being released before Christmas at the end of 1937.

History

Old Spice products were originally manufactured by the Shulton Company, founded in 1934 by William Lightfoot Schultz. A buyer at Bullock's in Los Angeles made Schultz aware of the emerging popularity of colonial-American style furniture, a trend spurred by the then-recent opening of Colonial Williamsburg. Shultz reasoned that an Early Americana-themed cosmetics line might also find favor. The Metropolitan Museum of Art in New York collection of early American objects provided a source of inspiration for packaging design; for the fragrance, Schultz was inspired by his mother's potpourri, and as a result, the first Old Spice product in 1937 was a woman's scent called Early American Old Spice. The product was received well and therefore was followed by Old Spice for men in 1938.

The men's products included shaving soap and aftershave lotion, marketed with a nautical theme. Sailing ships in particular were used for the brand's packaging. The original ships used on the packaging were the Grand Turk and the Friendship. Other ships used on Old Spice packaging include the John Wesley, Salem, Birmingham, Maria Teresa, Propontis, Recovery, Sooloo, Star of the West, Constitution, Java, United States, and Hamilton.

In the 1970s, Old Spice shifted from being a shaving brand to a fragrance brand by introducing signature scents like Old Spice Burley.

In June 1990, Procter & Gamble purchased the Old Spice fragrances, skincare and antiperspirant & deodorant brands from the Shulton Company. Throughout the 2000s, Procter & Gamble introduced many forms of deodorant, body washes, and body sprays in several scents under the Old Spice name.

In early 2008, the original Old Spice scent was repackaged as "Classic Scent", both in the aftershave and cologne versions. The white glass bottles gave way to plastic and the gray stoppers to red. Old Spice Classic shower gel was sold using the slogan "The original. If your grandfather hadn't worn it, you wouldn't exist."

In January 2016, Procter & Gamble changed the scent of its Old Spice Classic After Shave.

Products

Old Spice's buoy-shaped bottle cologne is available in its original scent as well as Pure Sport. In 2006, Old Spice introduced a fragrance, OS Signature, which won the magazine FHM's 2006 Grooming Award for Best Sporty Fragrance. Old Spice Red Zone products include a "Scratch-and-sniff" version of the signature fragrance.

In 2014, Old Spice expanded its product line-up to men's haircare by introducing shampoos, two-in-one shampoo and conditioners and styling products.

Advertising 

In the 1970s and 80s, Old Spice ad campaigns in the United Kingdom and Ireland featured a man on a surfboard accompanied by Carl Orff's O Fortuna from Carmina Burana, with the tagline "Old Spice – The Mark Of A Man".

An advertising campaign developed by Wieden + Kennedy in 2010 featuring Isaiah Mustafa became popular after the first advertisement, titled "The Man Your Man Could Smell Like".[2] Following this campaign, Old Spice introduced Fabio Lanzoni to challenge Isaiah Mustafa for the Old Spice Guy title in an online advertising campaign.

After the success of "The Man Your Man Could Smell Like", Old Spice released, "The Response Campaign". Over the course of two and a half days, the brand filmed 186 videos featuring Mustafa engaging in conversation with fans and celebrities. The campaign earned over 40 million views after the first week and led to Old Spice securing the spot of #1 all-time most viewed branded channel on YouTube.

Old Spice has partnered with the NFL and featured football stars including Ray Lewis, Greg Jennings, and Wes Welker in various TV and digital campaigns. In 2012, former NFL player Terry Crews was featured in the brand's viral hit "Muscle Music". The interactive video allowed people to make music through different musical instruments rigged to corresponding muscles on Crews's body.

In 2013, Old Spice launched a series of TV commercials in India titled "Mantastic Man" starring supermodel and actor Milind Soman.

The commercial "Momsong" became popular in 2014 as a part of the brand's "Smellcome to Manhood" campaign.

The "Make a Smellmitment" commercials with Mustafa and Crews debuted in 2015, promoting Timber (or Swagger) and Bearglove.

In early 2016, Old Spice introduced a new brand character, the Legendary Man, with two TV commercials, "Rocket Car" and "Whale", to launch the Hardest Working Collection. Old Spice also launched a series of digital infomercials with Canadian actor Steven Ogg. Later in 2016, the brand introduced two additional Old Spice characters, actors Thomas Beaudoin and Alberto Cardenas, in an advertising campaign for the Red Zone product collection.

Old Spice has sponsored many cars throughout the NASCAR world from 2004 to 2010. They first sponsored Ricky Craven at Talladega in 2004, then moved to Tony Stewart in Busch Races with Joe Gibbs Racing and Kevin Harvick Incorporated. In 2009, they followed Stewart when he formed his own team and car number 14 car for 2009 and 2010 with a win at Watkins Glen. Old Spice returned to NASCAR in 2019 to sponsor Corey LaJoie and Go Fas Racing's 32 car for the 2019 Daytona 500. The car had a unique design in which Corey LaJoie's face was designed on the hood of the car. The team finished 18th in that race. Old Spice was also featured as the sponsor of John C. Reilly's character, Cal Naughton Jr., in the 2006 comedy Talladega Nights.

In 2019, Old Spice named actor, comedian, and writer Deon Cole as its global brand ambassador for its five-piece line.

In January 2020, Old Spice brought back their viral 2010 campaign "Smell Like a Man, Man" to celebrate the tenth anniversary of the original commercial, and worked with Wieden + Kennedy once again for the reboot.

Awards 
Old Spice has accumulated 37 awards as of 2016 at the Cannes Lions International Festival of Creativity. Most notably, the brand was awarded two Gold Cannes Lions for Creative Effectiveness for "The Man Your Man Could Smell Like" in 2011 and "Smellcome to Manhood" in 2016.

References

External links
 
 Old Spice Original Scent at Basenotes Fragrance Directory

American brands
Perfumes
Personal care brands
Procter & Gamble brands
Products introduced in 1937
Shampoo brands
Soap brands